Doc Holliday is a radio personality. His career began during high school in early 1979 in New Jersey. He was the anchor of the Doc & Johnny Morning Show on WXXL-FM in Orlando, Florida, for over 17 years,  before resigning in March 2007. Also, Doc is the former arena announcer for the Orlando Predators of the Arena Football League.  

He was also the announcer for Family Double Dare in its last season (1992–93), replacing John Harvey. Other appearances on the airwaves include Clear Channel's 740 the Team and ESPN Radio. He was the voice of the Orlando Predators for seven years. During Spring Training for Major League Baseball, he can be heard announcing the line-ups and batters for both the Atlanta Braves (Disney's Wide World of Sports at the Walt Disney World Resort) and Houston Astros (Osceola County Stadium in Kissimmee). 

On March 5, 2007, as the show entered its 17th year, co-host Johnny Magic announced that Doc was moving on. In early May 2007, another core member of the morning show, Grace Vasquez, resigned citing differences with the stations management. Their morning show had won various awards for its outreach to the community.      

In September 2007, Doc joined Grace Vasquez at WWKA-FM "K92FM" on the show Doc and Grace in the Morning.  At K92FM Doc was known for speaking his mind on the issues and for his community involvement.  On September 1, 2010, it was announced that Doc would no longer be on the air at WWKA, but would remain employed by Cox Communications.

Doc rejoined the airwaves on the Big 810 Real Talk Radio with The Doc Show in late 2011. In mid-2012, when Big 810 re-formatted to sports radio, The Doc Show was re-formatted as a local sports talk show. In 2013, the show was moved from the afternoon to morning drive time, 7-10am weekdays, to coincide with the station's affiliation with CBS Sports Radio and the resultant addition of The Jim Rome Show.

Currently Doc Holliday is working on the development of the Phoenix Rising Radio Network.  Doc can be found hosting a live show Monday through Friday 6:00 PM to 9:00 PM (EST) with co-host Bam Bam Sam and on Saturday evenings with a 70s Show. The website is located at  DocShowCoast2Coast.com.  Studios are located in Saint Cloud, Florida

Doc also has 3 sons, Jeffrey (Born 1985), Gary, (Born 1988), and Zachary (Born 1995), and one grandson, Jeffrey.

External links
Doc and Johnny in the Morning.
Doc in the Morning.
Live Web Stream.

American radio personalities
Game show announcers
Living people
Year of birth missing (living people)